The 2012-13 season is HB Køge's 4th season in existent, since formed from Herfølge Boldklub and Køge Boldklub in 2009.

League table

References

External links
 HB Køge official website

2012-13
Danish football clubs 2012–13 season